Susie Chant is a Canadian politician, who was elected to the Legislative Assembly of British Columbia in the 2020 British Columbia general election. She represents the electoral district of North Vancouver-Seymour as a member of the British Columbia New Democratic Party. She is a member of the Select Standing Committee on Agriculture, Fish, and Food, the Select Standing Committee on Children and Youth, the Select Standing Committee on Health, and the Special Committee to Review the Freedom of Information and Protection of Privacy Act. She is now the Parliamentary Secretary for Accessibility.

Biography 

Chant has worked as a Registered Nurse and team leader in community care with Vancouver Coastal Health prior to being elected. She famously kept her job as a nurse for the first year she was in office, to assist in the COVID-19 pandemic and administer vaccines
Chant has also served as a member of the Royal Canadian Navy Reserves for over 40 years, she also kept her position within the reserves for a portion of her time in office until her retirement in 2022.

She and her husband are the parents of two adult daughters and were foster parents for 12 years. They provided a safe home for teenagers in crisis and supported them to get back to their families.

Chant's nursing career has also taken her overseas, teaching nursing students in Saipan and working in children's psychiatry in Hawaii.

She is an active member of Girl Guides of Canada and a former leader. She has also been a Sun Run clinic leader for 25 years, helping people in her community to be more active.

Chant's husband, Rick, runs a home-based business, repairing and maintaining augmentative technology for people with significant disabilities.

Electoral Record

References

21st-century Canadian politicians
21st-century Canadian women politicians
British Columbia New Democratic Party MLAs
Women MLAs in British Columbia
Living people
Year of birth missing (living people)